Hisehope Reservoir is the smallest of a group of three reservoirs located on Muggleswick Common, County Durham, the others being Waskerley and Smiddy Shaw Reservoirs.

The reservoir was completed 1906, and is owned and operated by Northumbrian Water. It feeds into Smiddy Shaw reservoir, which in turn feeds water under gravity to a water treatment works at Honey Hill.

Hisehope and its two neighbouring reservoirs are located within the Muggleswick, Stanhope and Edmundbyers Commons and Blanchland Moor Site of Special Scientific Interest, which itself forms part of the North Pennines Area of Outstanding Natural Beauty.

See also
 List of reservoirs and dams in the United Kingdom

References

Drinking water reservoirs in England
1906 establishments in England
Reservoirs in County Durham